Rallus is a genus of  wetland birds of the rail family. Sometimes, the genera Lewinia and Gallirallus are included in it. Six of the species are found in the Americas, and the three species found in Eurasia, Africa and Madagascar are very closely related to each other, suggesting they are descended from a single invasion of a New World ancestor.

These are slim, long-billed rails with slender legs. Their laterally flattened bodies are an adaptation to life in wet reedbeds and marshes, enabling them to slip easily through the dense semi-aquatic vegetation. Typically these birds have streaked brown upperparts, blue-grey on the face or breast, and barred flanks. Only the African rail has a plain back,  and  the plain-flanked rail lacks any blue-grey in its plumage and has no flank bars.

Three endemic South American species are endangered by habitat loss, and the Madagascar rail is becoming rare.

Taxonomy
The genus Rallus was erected in 1758 by the Swedish naturalist Carl Linnaeus in the tenth edition of his Systema Naturae. The type species was subsequently designated as the water rail (Rallus aquaticus). The genus name Rallus comes from the pre-binomial Latin name Rallus aquaticus for the water rail used by English ornithologist Francis Willughby in 1676, and by the English naturalist Eleazar Albin in 1731. The precise etymology of the word Rallus is uncertain.

Species
The genus contains 14 extant species:

Fossil record
 Rallus sp. (Sajóvölgyi Middle Miocene of Mátraszõlõs, Hungary)
 Rallus sp. (Rexroad Late Pliocene of Saw Rock Canyon, USA)
 Rallus adolfocaesaris Porto Santo rail (prehistoric of Madeira)
 Rallus auffenbergi (Middle Pleistocene of SE North America) – formerly Porzana
 Rallus carvaoensis São Miguel rail (prehistoric of São Miguel Island in the Azores)
 Rallus cyanocavi (Late Pleistocene of the Bahamas) 
 Rallus eivissensis, Ibiza rail (prehistoric)
 Rallus ibycus (Shore Hills Late Pleistocene of Bermuda, W Atlantic)
 Rallus lacustris (Late Pliocene of C North America)
 Rallus lowei Madeira rail (prehistoric of Madeira)
 Rallus minutus São Jorge rail (prehistoric of São Jorge Island in the Azores) - scientific name is provisional
 Rallus montivagorum Pico rail (prehistoric of Pico Island in the Azores)
 Rallus natator (Pleistocene of San Josecito Cavern, Mexico) – formerly Epirallus
 Rallus phillipsi (Late Pliocene of Wickieup, USA)
 Rallus prenticei (Late Pliocene of C North America)
 Rallus recessus (St Georges Soil Late Pleistocene of Bermuda, W Atlantic)
 Rallus richmondi – includes R. dubius

Formerly in Rallus
 "R." arenarius – now Quercyrallus
 "R." beaumontii, "R." dispar – now Pararallus or Palaeoaramides
 "R." christyi, "R." eximius, "R." minor – now Palaeoaramides
 "R." major – now Miorallus
 "R." porzanoides – now Paraortygometra

"R." sumiderensis apparently refers to prehistoric remains of the Zapata rail (Cyanolimnas cerverai).

References

References
 Gál, Erika; Hír, János; Kessler, Eugén & Kókay, József (1998–99): Középsõ-miocén õsmaradványok, a Mátraszõlõs, Rákóczi-kápolna alatti útbevágásból. I. A Mátraszõlõs 1. lelõhely [Middle Miocene fossils from the sections at the Rákóczi chapel at Mátraszőlős. Locality Mátraszõlõs I.]. Folia Historico Naturalia Musei Matraensis 23: 33–78. [Hungarian with English abstract] PDF fulltext
 Taylor, P. Barry & van Perlo, Ber (1998): Rails : a guide to the rails, crakes, gallinules, and coots of the world. Yale University Press, New Haven.

External links

 
Bird genera